Weymouth Sands is a novel by John Cowper Powys, which was written in rural upper New York State and published in February 1934 in New York City by Simon and Schuster. It was published in Britain as Jobber Skald in 1935 by John Lane. Weymouth Sands was the third of John Cowper Powys's so-called Wessex novels, which include Wolf Solent (1929), A Glastonbury Romance (1932), and Maiden Castle (1936). Powys was an admirer of novelist and poet Thomas Hardy, and these novels are set in Somerset and Dorset, part of Hardy's mythical Wessex. American scholar Richard Maxwell describes these four novels "as remarkably successful with the reading public of his time". The setting of this novel is the English seaside town of Weymouth, Dorset.

Background

Powys's paternal grandmother lived in Weymouth, and when his father became a curate in nearby Dorchester, the family took temporary lodgings behind Brunswick Terrace, where she lived in 1879. Weymouth remained throughout Powys's life the place where he was most at home and "[a]lways in [his] memory was the pebbled seashore opposite Brunswick Terrace". C.A. Coates in her book on Powys notes the importance of Weymouth for his imagination, quoting from Autobiography: "every aspect of the Weymouth Coast sank into my mind with such a  transubstantiating magic" that "it is through the medium of these things that I envisage all the experiences of my life".<ref>John Cowper Powys in Search of a Landscape'‘. Totowa, NJ: Barnes and Noble, 1982, p. 119. See Autobiography, London: Macdonald, 1967, p. 151.</ref> When he died in 1963 Powys's ashes were scattered on nearby Chesil Beach.
Powys notes in his Diary on Valentine's Day 1932 that "I'm really going to begin my Weymouth Book" and he also records that he had been given "Hardy's Well-Beloved by his lover Phyllis Playter, a novel which is set in on the Isle of Portland where Jobber Skald, the protagonist of Weymouth Sands, comes from.Weymouth Sands is the title of the American first edition and an English edition then appeared in 1935, but prior to its publication Powys and his English publishers were successfully sued for libel by Gerard Hodgkinson, who claimed that the character of Philip Crow in A Glastonbury Romance had been based on him. The damages awarded crippled Powys financially, and he was forced to make substantial changes to the British edition of Weymouth Sands. The title of the English version was changed to Jobber Skald (1935) and all references to the real-life Weymouth were cut.
"Powys tells the story of Jobber Skald - a large, somewhat brutish man, obsessed with the urge to kill the local magnate of the town because of the man's contempt for the workers of the local quarry - and his redeeming love for Perdita Wane, a young girl from the Channel Islands. Weymouth Sands boasts a striking collection of human oddities including a famous clown, his mad brother, a naive Latin teacher, a young philosopher, and an abortionist."

Novelist Margaret Drabble comments, "Weymouth Sands is a celebration of the seaside town [Powys] had loved as a child, but its tone is far from innocent. The novel features a sinister clown figure and Punch and Judy shows: Powys was not one to shy away from the suggestions of violence and child sex abuse that are now routinely associated with such entertainments."

Critical reception
Philosopher John Gray comments that 
In Wolf Solent and Weymouth Sands, perhaps the most accomplished of the Wessex series of novels that includes the panoramic Glastonbury Romance, Powys evokes the floating world of moment-to-moment awareness as found in a collection of characters living on the edges of society, struggling to fashion a life in which their contradictory impulses could somehow be reconciled. The fusion of introspective analysis with an animistic sense of the elemental background of human life which he achieves in these books is unique in European literature.

Bibliography
EditionsWeymouth Sands: A Novel. New York: Simon & Schuster, 1934 
2nd impression, N.Y.Jobber Skald, John Lane: London,1935

London: Macdonald, 1963 

New York: Harper & Row, 1984, Introduction by James Purdy  ISBN: 0060911646

Cambridge: Rivers Press, 1973 Introduction by Angus Wilson  ISBN: 0903747049;

London: Writers and Readers Publishing Cooperative, 1979 ISBN: 0906495202 

London : Pan Books (Mcmillan), 1980 ISBN: 0330260502 

Woodstock, NY: Overlook Press, 1999  ISBN: 9780879517069

London: Penguin, 2000 ISBN: 0140286470

London: Duckworth, 2009

Kindle version:‎ Valmy Publishing, 2018 The Powys Society, 2019 

Translations

In French Les Sables de la mer, translated Marie Canavaggia, with introduction by Jean Wahl. Paris: Plon, 1958  ISBN: 9783861504221

In German Der Strand von Weymouth, translated by Melanie Walz. Munich:Carl Hanser Verlag,1999 ASIN: 3446197761

Critical studies

Collins, H. P., "The Sands Do Not Run Out", in Essays on John Cowper Powys, edited Belinda Humfrey. Cardiff: University of Wales Press, 1972, pp. 206–18.
Humfrey, Belinda, ed.The Powys Review. Index to critical articles and other material: 
Krissdottir, Morine. Descents of Memory: The Life of John Cowper Powys. New York: Overlook Duckworth, 2007, pp. 273–81.
Low, Anthony, "Dry Sand and Wet Sand: Margins and Thresholds in Weymouth Sands", in In the Spirit of Powys: New essays. Cranbury, NJ: Associated University Presses, 1990, pp. 112–135.
Peltier, Jacqueline, ed. la lettre powysienne. Index to critical articles and other material:  .

See also
 Powys, John Cowper, Owen Glendower Powys, John Cowper, Porius: A Romance of the Dark Ages''

External links
A tour of Weymouth
Text of Weymouth Sands online, at the Internet Archive

References

Modernist novels
1934 British novels
Works by John Cowper Powys
Novels set in Dorset